Fabiola Jeimmy Tahíz Aburto (born 1994) is a Guatemalan model and beauty pageant titleholder who was crowned Miss Guatemala 2015 and represented Guatemala at the Miss Universe 2015 pageant.

Personal life

Miss Guatemala 2015 
Jeimmy Tahíz was crowned Miss Guatemala 2015 on September 20, 2015 in Guatemala City. She edged out 11 other finalists for the title. She represented Guatemala City. As Miss Guatemala, she represented Guatemala at the Miss Universe 2015 pageant.

References

External links 
 Official Miss Guatemala website

1994 births
Living people
Miss Guatemala winners
Miss Universe 2015 contestants